Prince Pavel Petrovich Ukhtomsky  ( 10 June 1848 – 14 October 1910) was a career naval officer in the Imperial Russian Navy, noted for his action at the Battle of the Yellow Sea in the Russo-Japanese War of 1904-1905. His family traced their lineage to the Rurik Dynasty, and had been moderately prominent boyars in the Muscovite period.  He was held in scant respect by his colleagues, who felt that his rank and position owed more to family connections than any competence or ability. Lt. Commander Newton A. McCully, American Naval attaché in Port Arthur through much of the siege noted that Ukhtomsky "was not esteemed as particularly able, but was considered a Russian patriot, and had the credit with the fleet of having forced Admiral Vitgeft to make the sortie of June 23"

Biography
Ukhtomsky’s family traced their lineage to the Rurik Dynasty, and had been moderately prominent boyars in the Muscovite period.

Ukhtomsky graduated from the Sea Cadets in 1867 and the Maritime College in 1873, as a specialist in mine warfare. He was promoted to captain, 2nd rank in 1885 and to captain, 1st rank in 1894. From 1896, he was commander of the cruiser , followed by the battleship  in 1900. In 1901, Ukhtomsky was promoted to rear admiral and appointed chief-of-staff of Kronstadt.

At the start of the Russo-Japanese War, Ukhtomsky was at Port Arthur as deputy commander under Admiral Oskar Starck and was entrusted with a portion of the battleship squadron.  Following Starck’s dismissal on 24 February 1904, he served as acting commander of the Port Arthur squadron for ten days until the arrival of Vice Admiral Stepan Makarov. He was awarded the Order of St. Stanislaus, 1st class with swords, for his participation in the defense of the Russian base against Japanese destroyer attacks.

After the death of Admiral Makarov on 13 April, Ukhtomsky again served as acting commander until Admiral Yevgeni Ivanovich Alekseyev reassumed command.  During the Battle of the Yellow Sea, after Admiral Wilgelm Vitgeft on the battleship  had been killed in combat, command of the fleet fell to Ukhtomsky. The signal halyards of his flagship, the battleship , had been shot away, so it took some time to get signals to the rest of the fleet.  Ukhtomsky ordered the fleet to return to the safety of Port Arthur. While some perceived his actions as acts of cowardice, to be fair to Prince Ukhtomsky he was not a coward. The Peresvet suffered significant damage at Yellow Sea.  According to Lt. Commander Newton McCully (the American naval attache in Port Arthur) who visited the ship after the engagement and observed the damage, the Peresvet received no fewer than sixteen "well defined" penetrating hits by shells of 8" and larger - the most of any Russian ship in the engagement.  By the end of the battle Peresvet was unable to steam at more than six knots (because of significant damage to her funnels and thus to the boilers below) leaving Ukhtomsky with little practical choice but to return to Port Arthur with the rest of the slow battleships and heavily damaged cruisers.  He commanded Port Arthur for the next three weeks until replaced on 4 September by the lower-ranking Captain Robert Wiren.

After the end of the war, Ukhtomsky retired from active service on 24 July 1906 citing illness and was promoted to position of vice admiral. He died on 14 October 1910 in St. Petersburg.

Honors
  Order of St. Stanislaus, 1st degree with swords, 1904

References
 Connaughton, Richard. Rising Sun and Tumbling Bear: Russia's War with Japan . Cassell (2003). 
 Jukes, Jeffery. The Russo-Japanese War 1904-1905．Osprey 2002. 
 McCully, Newton, "The McCully Report: The Russo-Japanese War, 1904-05," Naval Institute Press (1977).  

 Stafford, Julian. Maritime Operations in the Russo-Japanese War 1904-1905. Naval Institute Press (1997). 
 Warner, Dennis & Peggy. The Tide at Sunrise; A History of the Russo-Japanese War, 1904-1905 . Charterhouse. (1974)

Notes

1848 births
1910 deaths
Imperial Russian Navy admirals
Russian military personnel of the Russo-Japanese War
Recipients of the Order of Saint Stanislaus (Russian), 1st class
Rurikids
Naval Cadet Corps alumni